Mentallo is a Marvel Comics character.

Mentallo may also refer to:

Flex Mentallo, a DC Comics character
Mentallo and the Fixer, an American industrial music band

See also
Metallo, a DC Comics character